Deh-e Asghar (also Romanized as Deh-e Aşghar; also known as Deh ‘Asgar, Deh ‘Askar, Deh ‘Askur, Deh-e ‘Asgar, and Deh-e ‘Askar) is a village in Hendudur Rural District, Sarband District, Shazand County, Markazi Province, Iran. At the 2006 census, its population was 98, in 27 families.

References 

Populated places in Shazand County